The Great Battles is a computer wargame series based on the Great Battles of History board game series by GMT Games. The three titles in the series—The Great Battles of Alexander, The Great Battles of Hannibal and The Great Battles of Caesar—were developed by Erudite Software and published by Interactive Magic.

Gameplay

Games
The Great Battles of Alexander (June 22, 1997)
The Great Battles of Hannibal (November 7, 1997)
The Great Battles of Caesar (March 26, 1998)
The Great Battles Collector's Edition (December 1998)

Development history
Erudite Software developed all three Great Battles titles with the same game engine.

Reception
According to Computer Games Strategy Plus, the Great Battles games were "very well received by wargamers", and were successful enough that Interactive Magic worked with Erudite Software again to produce the wargame North vs. South. Alan Dunkin of GameSpot likewise called the series a "relative success".

The Great Battles Collector's Edition won the 1998 Charles Roberts Award for "Best Pre-Twentieth Century Computer Wargame".

References

External links
Archived homepage

Computer wargames
Video game franchises
Video game franchises introduced in 1997
Video games based on board games